Brumovice may refer to places in the Czech Republic:

Brumovice (Břeclav District), a municipality and village in the South Moravian Region
Brumovice (Opava District), a municipality and village in the Moravian-Silesian Region